Ralph John Langtrey Lynas (29 February 1904–1992) was an Irish footballer who played in the Football League for Nottingham Forest.

References

1904 births
1992 deaths
Association football forwards
English Football League players
Association footballers from Northern Ireland
Cliftonville F.C. players
Nottingham Forest F.C. players
Ards F.C. players